Aharon ben Joseph haLevi (‎; 1235 – c. 1290), known by his Hebrew acronym Ra'aH, was a medieval rabbi, Talmudic scholar and Halakhist.

Aharon haLevi was born in Girona, Catalonia (present-day Spain) in 1235 to his father Rabbi Joseph ha-Levi, son of Rabbi Benveniste ha-Levi, son of Rabbi Joseph ha-Levi, who was the son of Rabbi Zerachiah ha-Levi of Girona Baal Hamaor. The Ra'ah's mother Clara, was a granddaughter of Rabbi Aaron of Lunel who was the son of Rabbi Meshullam ben Jacob of Lunel ("Rabbenu Meshullam hagadol").

Aharon haLevi studied under his father Rabbi Joseph ha-Levi and brother Rabbi Pinchas ben Joseph ha-Levi, as well as Nachmanides and was a colleague of Rabbi Shlomo ben Aderet (1235–1310). He published critical notes on the Rashba's Torat HaBayith, which he entitled Bedek HaBayith. He also wrote a commentary on the Talmud, select parts of which have been published.

The sixteenth century author Gedaliah ibn Yaḥyah also credited ha-Levi as the author of the anonymous Sefer ha-Chinuch ("Book of Education"), although this claim has been rejected by many scholars due to discrepancies between opinions expressed in Bedek HaBayith and the Chinuch. This has led to the conclusion that the true author of the Sefer ha-Chinuch was a different "Aaron ha-levi of Barcelona", who was a student of Shlomo ben Aderet, rather than his colleague. More recently, Professor Israel Ta-Shma of the Hebrew University of Jerusalem has presented that the author of "Sefer ha-Chinuch" was in fact Rabbi Aaron's brother, Pinchas ben Joseph ha-Levi, who had written the work for his son, Joshua.

Rabbi Yom Tov Asevilli was one of Aharon HaLevi's students.

Sources

13th-century Catalan rabbis
1235 births
1290 deaths
Rabbis from Girona
Levites
Authors of books on Jewish law